The Suggestibles is a British improv comedy group, based in Newcastle upon Tyne.

Formed in 2003 at Live Theatre they went on to find a following at their home venue, The Cumberland Arms in the Ouseburn Valley, playing there every month and, since 2011, also monthly at The Stand Comedy Club. The group have also played regular residencies at The Hyena, Black Swan and The Mixer in Jesmond.

The group has a core team of players (in 2018 this is currently Bev Fox, Ian McLaughlin, Carl Kennedy, Tom Walton and Rachel Glover) and are usually accompanied by Alex Ross, an improvising musician, and often a special guest from other UK improv companies. Previous core members of the team have included Gary Kitching and Chris Price. Guest players have included Niall Ashdown, Victoria Elliott, Stephen Frost, Paula Penman, Lee Simpson, Andy Smart, Steve Steen, Richard Vranch, Stella Duffy, Suki Webster and Tony Slattery.

Their regular show usually consists of two 45 minute sets, with improv games and short forms in the first half, and "Aspects" - a long form (or narrative) improvised musical in the second.

The group's roots can be traced to 1992, when founder members Bev Fox and Ian McLaughlin created 'The Impro Panto' with a mini London tour (sponsored by Cadbury's) at the Arts Theatre, BAC, Gate and Banana. The group present their "Impro Pantso", an improvised pantomime, every Christmas at both Northern Stage and the Cumberland Arms.  which now also tours additional venues including Gala Theatre in Durham, Seaton Deleval Arts Centre, Hexham Queens Hall, Washington Arts Centre and Alnwick Playhouse.

On 23 April 2005 The Suggestibles were the winning team at London's Globe Theatre in Ken Campbell's Shakespearean improv tournament: Shall We Shog? beating teams from London and Liverpool. They have also performed at Bristol Jam, an annual improv festival held at the Bristol Old Vic, since its inception in 2009.

Away from the stage, the Suggestibles have an online following for their videos and live improv clips. They won a Royal Television Society Award in 2008 for Pour Quoi (a skit on Parkour) which was an  overnight  YouTube hit with over 800,000 views there. The team also presented a live radio show on NE1FM for six months in 2008.

Two founder members of the group, Bev Fox and Ian McLaughlin, also teach improv skills for personal and business development, as Suggestibles' School of Improv.

Notes

External links
The Suggestibles
TripAdvisor- The Suggestibles at The Stand
TripAdvisor- The Suggestibles at The Cumberland Arms 
Living North- Impro Pantso review
Shields Gazette- Suggestibles at The Stand
The Journal- Suggestibles British Legion

Improvisational troupes
British comedy troupes
2003 establishments in England